Invisible Sun is a surrealistic fantasy tabletop role-playing game written by Monte Cook, published in 2018.

Game

Setting
The characters the players take on in the game are various types of magic-users, collectively called Vislae. The setting is called the Actuality, consisting of a series of differing worlds arranged in a pattern called The Path of Suns. Our world is seen as a pale and illusory reflection of these worlds. The center and starting point of the setting is Satyrine, a large city devastated by war. "The setting is surreal, bringing to mind post World War I decadent Berlin, Neil Gaiman's Sandman comics and the films of Guillermo del Toro", leaving our world behind. Characters slipping back into "Shadow", the game's name for our world, is used as an in-universe explanation for player absences. Another major theme is secrets which the characters can pursue. The game material itself also contains mysteries for the players to figure out.

Game mechanics
The game mechanics of Invisible Sun are based on the Cypher System, introduced with the Numenera game, with some modifications to simplify involved math and allow for more complex characters and powerful and unpredictable magic. Players have a significant influence on the stories, as character goals play a big role within the rules. Another game mechanic provides different experience points for successes and failures of the characters, which makes setbacks a required part of the story to properly advance a character.

Game materials
The game comes in the form of an unusual, elaborate box, comprising a great number of components, called the Black Cube. It contains four books, ca. 1000 cards, the Tarot-like Sooth Deck, character sheets, handouts, tokens, dice, posters, and an artbook. The "game developers also created an Invisible Sun mobile application to accommodate side scenes for individual or groups of characters that are away from the table and even possibly without the GM." This app provides a digital version of physical components of the game, but no additional content.

Reception
Reviewer Luke Finewalker commented that the Black Cube was elaborately produced and quite expensive, which together with the advertising of limited availability expressed a certain exclusivity.

Forbes contributor Rob Wieland judged: "Invisible Sun is a dense game that rewards in-depth meditation on character", published in form of "the strangest boxed set ever created for any medium. It is also immensely fascinating." He found the price high but pointed to the cheaper digital form that was published in 2020.

Tabletop Gaming reviewer Richard Jansen-Parkes called Invisible Sun "a truly, genuinely, maddeningly unique RPG" and "a game that straddles the line between indulgence and inspiration". Aside from the "rather impressive price tag", Jansen-Parkes wondered how much of the enjoyment he experienced playing the game "comes from the actual quality, and how much it owes more to the grand presentation and price". In his opinion Invisible Sun is not suited for fans of simplicity in games, but "a truly incredible display of creativity" and fascinating to read.

Products

References 

Fantasy role-playing games
Kickstarter-funded tabletop games
Role-playing games introduced in 2018